Beaver Falls is a city in Beaver County, Pennsylvania, United States. The population was 9,005 at the 2020 census. Located 31 miles (50 km) northwest of Pittsburgh, the city lies along the Beaver River, six miles (9 km) north of its confluence with the Ohio River. It is a part of the Pittsburgh metropolitan area.

History

The area of present-day Beaver Falls was first mentioned in 1770 in the journals of David Zeisberger, a Moravian Church missionary who eventually settled in present-day Lawrence County. A Lenape chief named Pakanke took Zeisberger to the valley surrounding the Beaver River, where the Lenape owned a large tract of open land which Zeisberger was given access to. In April 1770, Zeisberger and his followers set out in 16 canoes down the Allegheny and Ohio rivers, reaching the mouth of the Beaver three days later. They made their way up to what was called the “Falls of the Beaver," where they encamped. Early settlers included Dr. Samuel and Milo Adams around the upper falls, whilst David Hoopes and Isaac Wilson developed the middle falls. The town originally formed around the middle falls area was named Brighton after Brighton, England, which was the hometown of the area's surveyors.

Despite early promise through the canal business on the falls, the town fell behind neighboring New Brighton after repeated poor economic periods. The earlier proprietors sold the land to the Harmony Society in 1859. The Harmonists immediately brought in surveyors to re-plan Brighton, laying out a town twice the size of the original, paving several main streets with brick and officially changing the name of the community to Beaver Falls. The rapid revitalization of the community allowed it to gain borough status on November 9, 1868. In the 1870s, Beaver Falls was home to a Chinatown and had up to 225 Chinese residents, brought in to work at Beaver Falls Cutlery Company moved in to the borough by the Harmonists.

On May 31, 1985, an F3 tornado hit just north of the city as it went across northern portions of Beaver County, as part of the 1985 United States-Canadian tornado outbreak.

The population declined nearly 50% between 1940 and 2000, which is attributed mostly to its central location in the Rust Belt.

Geography
Beaver Falls is located at  (40.758865, -80.319737).

Climate
Beaver Falls experiences a humid continental climate with cold winters and hot summers.

Demographics

As of the census of 2000, there were 9,920 people, 3,798 households, and 2,259 families residing in the city. The population density was 4,681.6 people per square mile (1,806.7/km2). There were 4,380 housing units at an average density of 2,067.1 per square mile (797.7/km2).  The racial makeup of the city was 78.82% White, 17.53% African American, 0.13% Native American, 0.62% Asian, 0.02% Pacific Islander, 0.50% from other races, and 2.37% from two or more races. Hispanic or Latino of any race were 1.06% of the population.

Government

Beaver Falls had been a third class city under the Pennsylvania local government structure until a home rule charter went into effect on January 3, 2022. The city's charter maintains a commissioned mayor-council form of government; a mayor and four city council members constitute the commission and serve as the governing body of the city. Since the 2021 election cycle, the mayor has been Dr. Kenya Johns, and the council members Leonard Chiappetta, Peggy Evans, Vanessa Ford-Taylor, and John Kirkland.

A city manager is employed to oversee day to day operations and oversight of the city’s main departments: Administration, Department of Finance & Taxation, Department of Public Works, Fire Department, Police Department, and Community Development. The current city manager is Charles Jones Jr.

Education

Children in Beaver Falls are served by the Big Beaver Falls Area School District. The current schools serving Beaver Falls are:
Central Elementary School – grades K-5
Beaver Falls Middle School – grades 6-8
Beaver Falls High School – grades 9-12

The city has a public library, the Carnegie Free Library of Beaver Falls, which was the first dedicated library building in Beaver County. It was a financed Carnegie library, opening in 1899.

Transportation
The closest airport to the city is Beaver County Airport.  Though located in Allegheny County, Pittsburgh International Airport is within close proximity of Beaver Falls, and is easily accessible by way of I-376 (former PA 60).

The following highways pass through Beaver Falls: 
   State Route 18
   State Route 588

Notable people
Ella M. George, teacher, lecturer, social reformer
Herbert A. Gilbert, inventor of the electronic cigarette
Thomas Midgley Jr., chemist and engineer, known for his role in the development of leaded gasoline
 Ryan "Archie" Miller - former NCAA Basketball coach for the Dayton Flyers and Indiana Hoosiers
Joe Namath, Hall of Fame AFL and NFL quarterback
Tom Tribone, energy entrepreneur, founded several major energy companies and early member of AES Corporation
Mike Veon, former member of the Pennsylvania House of Representatives, known for his involvement in the 2006 Pennsylvania General Assembly bonus controversy
Joe Walton, former American football player and coach, creator and head coach of football program at Robert Morris University

References

External links

City website

 
Cities in Beaver County, Pennsylvania
Cities in Pennsylvania
Populated places established in 1868